Andrea Bagioli (born 23 March 1999) is an Italian cyclist, who currently rides for UCI WorldTeam . He is the younger brother of Nicola Bagioli, who is also a cyclist. In October 2020, he was named in the startlist for the 2020 Vuelta a España.

Major results

2016
 1st Trofeo Citta di Loano
 6th Overall Grand Prix Rüebliland
2017
 3rd Overall Course de la Paix Juniors
 4th Gran Premio dell'Arno
 5th Overall Giro della Lunigiana
2018
 1st  Overall Toscana-Terra di Ciclismo
1st  Points classification
1st Stage 3
 2nd Piccolo Giro di Lombardia
 2nd Liège–Bastogne–Liège Espoirs
 3rd G.P. Palio del Recioto
 5th Giro del Medio Brenta
2019
 1st  Overall Ronde de l'Isard
1st Stages 2 & 3
 1st Piccolo Giro di Lombardia
 1st Trofeo Città di San Vendemiano
 1st Stage 5 Giro della Valle d'Aosta
2020
 1st Stage 1 Tour de l'Ain
 2nd Overall Settimana Internazionale di Coppi e Bartali
1st Stages 1b (TTT) & 2
 5th Giro dell'Emilia
 7th Brabantse Pijl
 10th Classic Sud-Ardèche
2021
 1st La Drôme Classic
 4th Overall Tour de l'Ain
1st  Young rider classification
 Vuelta a España
Held  after Stages 1 & 2
2022
 1st Stage 7 Volta a Catalunya
 3rd Grand Prix Cycliste de Montréal
 8th Gran Piemonte
2023
 3rd La Drôme Classic
 10th Trofeo Calvia

Grand Tour general classification results timeline

References

External links

1999 births
Living people
Italian male cyclists
Cyclists from Aosta Valley
People from Aosta
21st-century Italian people